Hazinedar is a Turkish language surname. It is derived from words hazine(t) and Persian language suffix -dar. Vuk Karadžić in Srpski rječnik noted that Serbian surname Haznadarović is derived from the occupation of family ancestor who was hazinedar.

Notable people 
Admir Haznadar, Bosnian footballer

References 

Turkish-language surnames
Persian words and phrases